Jamaibabu (The Brother-in-Law) is a Bengali language romance drama film directed by Dulal Bhowmik and with music composed by Bappi Lahiri. This film was released in 1996 under the banner of Filmalaya Private Limited.

Plot 
Rama, the daughter of Mr. Chunilal, is studying in a college in Kolkata. She is a girl who does not care about anything. In a college function she quarrels with a boy named Dulal. Rama fabricates a plan to expel Dulal from college, but Dulal saves her from another student Mantu from getting raped. Then Rama thought about her fault and fall in love with Dulal. After having intimate Rama become pregnant and informed another college mate as well as their best friend Jayanta, the son of business tycoon Biren Mukherjee. Jayanta asked Dulal to marry Rama. He also arranged a safe place for the new couple in his house. On the other hand, Rama's father Chunilal fixed the marriage of Rama with the same Jayanta. When Chunilal came to know that Rama has already been married with another person, become angry and come to Kolkata from Asansol with his younger daughter Rina. Suddenly they saw Jayanta's picture and guessed Jayanta as Rama's husband as they fixed earlier. To control the damage Dulal posed to be a servant and Jayanta become Rina's loving 'Jamaibabu'. But one day Rina knows the whole plot. In the meanwhile Mantu come to know everything about the concocted fact of Rama and Dulal. He started to blackmail Rama for money and kidnapped Dulal and Rina. Jayanta goes to save Dulal and his would be wife Rina.

Cast 
 Subhendu Chatterjee as Chunilal
 Tapas Paul as Dulal
 Abhishek Chatterjee as Jayanta
 Satabdi Roy as Rama
 Indrani Haldar as Rina
 Chinmoy Roy as Chunilal's brother in law 
 Arun Bannerjee as Biren Mukherjee
 Rahul Barman as Mantu

Songs 
This film received Bengal Film Journalists' Association Awards in the year of 1997 for Best Music.
 "Amra Premi Premer Dol"
 "Tumi Kajol Ami Tomar Nayan"
 "Chhi Chhi Eki Kando Korecho"

References 

Bengali-language Indian films
1996 films
Indian romantic drama films
1996 romantic drama films
1990s Bengali-language films